Fort MacKay Airport may refer to a number of airports around Fort MacKay, Alberta.

Fort MacKay/Albian Aerodrome
Fort MacKay/Firebag Aerodrome
Fort MacKay/Horizon Airport